German Township, Ohio, may refer to:
German Township, Auglaize County, Ohio
German Township, Clark County, Ohio
German Township, Fulton County, Ohio
German Township, Harrison County, Ohio
German Township, Montgomery County, Ohio

Ohio township disambiguation pages